Akoete Henritse 'Henri' Eninful (born 21 July 1992) is a Togolese professional footballer who plays as a midfielder.

Career

FC Lahti
On 22 January 2020 Finnish club FC Lahti confirmed the signing of Eninful on a one-year contract with an option for one further year.

References

External links
Stats at HLSZ 

1992 births
Living people
People from Plateaux Region, Togo
Togolese footballers
Association football midfielders
Belgian Pro League players
Nemzeti Bajnokság I players
Nemzeti Bajnokság II players
Cypriot First Division players
Veikkausliiga players
Standard Liège players
Újpest FC players
Kecskeméti TE players
Doxa Katokopias FC players
FC Lahti players
Togo international footballers
2017 Africa Cup of Nations players
Togolese expatriate footballers
Expatriate footballers in Belgium
Expatriate footballers in Hungary
Expatriate footballers in Cyprus
Expatriate footballers in Finland
Togolese expatriate sportspeople in Belgium
Togolese expatriate sportspeople in Hungary
Togolese expatriate sportspeople in Cyprus
Togolese expatriate sportspeople in Finland
21st-century Togolese people